Fostoria may refer to:

 Fostoria Glass Company 1887-1990s
 Fostoria dhimbangunmal, a dinosaur

Places in the United States:
 Fostoria, Iowa
 Fostoria, Kansas
 Fostoria, Michigan
 Fostoria, Ohio
 Fostoria, Pennsylvania